Zofia Nowakowska (born 25 February 1988, Kościan) is a Polish singer. She has been a leading vocalist of the Studio Buffo musical theater and has appeared on artistic presentations headed by the composer Piotr Rubik. Besides Polish performances, she has also recorded an English version of the song "The Right to Love". In 2021, she played the role of Jenna Hunterson in a Polish version of "Waitress the Musical".

Career 
From 2004-2010, Nowakowska was part of the Studio Buffo musical theatre company where she played in several roles including Marie Antoinette in Ça Ira , a musical written by Roger Waters.

She has worked on dubbing several Disney films into Polish. Most notably doing the voice of Nali in The Lion King (2019)

References

External links
 To cała prawda
 Psalm z bukietem konwalii

1988 births
Living people
21st-century Polish singers
21st-century Polish women singers